Noah Gal Gendler (born August 12, 1957) is the Ambassador Extraordinary and Plenipotentiary of Israel to Albania. He is also the non-resident Israeli Ambassador to Bosnia and Herzegovina.

Biography
Born in Haifa, Israel, Gendler served in the Israeli Defense Forces from 1975–79, where he was a Captain in Artillery.Gendler holds a B.A. in Geography and Political Science, University of Haifa, 1985, and an M.A. in Political Science, Hebrew University of Jerusalem, 1986 He is married, with five children.

Diplomatic career

Gendler has been the Ambassador Extraordinary and Plenipotentiary of Israel to Albania since September 2019. He is also the non-resident Israeli Ambassador to Bosnia and Herzegovina.

2017–2019: Ambassador to Kenya, Uganda, Tanzania, Seychelles and Malawi
2006–2011: Ambassador to Bulgaria
1997–2002: Ambassador to Uzbekistan
1991–1995: Deputy Chief of Mission in Bangkok, Thailand
1989–1991: Deputy Chief of Mission in Katmandu, Nepal

References

1957 births
People from Haifa
Ambassadors of Israel to Albania
Ambassadors of Israel to Kenya
Ambassadors of Israel to Uganda
Ambassadors of Israel to Tanzania
Ambassadors of Israel to Seychelles
Ambassadors of Israel to Malawi
Ambassadors of Israel to Bulgaria
Ambassadors of Israel to Uzbekistan
Living people